Caldas Sport Clube is a Portuguese professional football team based in Caldas da Rainha. Founded on 15 May 1916, the club competes in the Campeonato de Portugal.

History
Between 1956 and 1959, Caldas participated in the Portuguese Liga, the top level of Portuguese football, but they currently play in the Campeonato de Portugal. In 2018, Caldas reached the semi-finals of Taça de Portugal, along with Desportivo das Aves, Sporting CP and FC Porto.

External links
 Caldas Sport Clube official website 

 
Sport in Caldas da Rainha
Football clubs in Portugal
Association football clubs established in 1916
Sport in Leiria
1916 establishments in Portugal
Primeira Liga clubs